Michaël Llodra and Nenad Zimonjić were the defending champions, but both opted to play at the London Summer Olympics instead.
Treat Conrad Huey and Dominic Inglot won the title, defeating Kevin Anderson and Sam Querrey 7–6(9–7), 6–7(9–11), [10–5], in the final.

Seeds

Draw

Draw

References
General

Specific

Citi Open - Men's Doubles